This is a list of airlines currently operating in Cuba.

See also
 List of airlines

Cuba
 
Airlines
Airlines
Cuba